Heather Roach Variava is an American diplomat who is the nominee to be the US Ambassador to Laos.

Early life and education
Variava received a bachelor's degree from Georgetown University’s School of Foreign Service. Variava also received master's degrees from the University of Missouri, the University of Sussex, and the National War College. In addition, she finished a fellowship with the International Women’s Forum.

Career
Variava is a career member of the Senior Foreign Service with the rank of Minister-Counselor. She currently serves as the Deputy Chief of Mission at the U.S. Embassy in Manila, Philippines. Variava previously had stints as Deputy Chief of Mission and Chargé d'Affaires, ad interim, at the U.S. Embassy in Jakarta, Indonesia, as well as the U.S. Consul General in Surabaya, Indonesia. Domestically, Variava was the Director of the Office of Nepal, Sri Lanka, Bangladesh, Maldives, and Bhutan in the Bureau of South and Central Asian Affairs, and also worked at the State Department Operations Center. Overseas assignments include postings at U.S. Missions in India, Mauritius, Vietnam, and Bangladesh.

Ambassador to Laos
On February 13, 2023, President Joe Biden nominated Variava to be the next ambassador to Laos.

Personal life
A native of Iowa, Variava speaks Indonesian, and has studied French, German, and Vietnamese.

References

Living people
Walsh School of Foreign Service alumni
University of Missouri alumni
21st-century American diplomats
American women diplomats
United States Foreign Service personnel
Alumni of the University of Sussex
National War College alumni
Year of birth missing (living people)
People from Iowa